Nine Regional may refer to:

 WIN Television, the current Nine Network regional affiliate since July 2021
 10 (Southern Cross Austereo), a former Nine Network regional affiliate which carried Nine Network programming from July 2016 to July 2021, and carried the Nine Regional name